A joint meeting of the Australian Parliament is a convening of members of the Senate and House of Representatives sitting together as a single legislative body.

Australia has a bicameral federal parliament, consisting of the Senate and the House of Representatives.  Subject to the Constitution of Australia, each House has its own rules, standing orders and procedures; its own presiding officer; and meets separately, at dates and times it alone decides.

However, there are some occasions when the two Houses have come together as a single body.

Reasons for joint meetings
The reasons for joint meetings have included:
 to resolve deadlocks between the Houses following a double dissolution
 to fill casual vacancies in the representation of the territories in the Senate
 a special commemorative joint sitting to celebrate the Centenary of Federation
 secret meetings to discuss security-related issues, such as Australia's participation in war
 to receive addresses by invited guests such as visiting foreign heads of state or government.

Resolving deadlocks between the two Houses

The Constitution makes provision for a joint sitting as part of a procedure to resolve legislative deadlocks between the House of Representatives and the Senate.  Section 57 provides that, under certain circumstances where there is a deadlock over a bill, both houses may be dissolved in a double dissolution.  This is followed by a general election, and the bill may be put to the separate Houses of the newly elected parliament for reconsideration.  If this still fails to resolve the deadlock, the bill may be considered by a joint sitting, convened as a single legislative body.  If passed by the joint sitting, the bill will be treated for all purposes as if it had been separately passed by the two Houses.

The only time such a joint sitting has occurred was on 6–7 August 1974.

Casual vacancies in the representation of the Territories in the Senate

Between 1980 and 1989 when the Australian Capital Territory (ACT) gained self-government, the choice of a replacement ACT senator to fill a casual vacancy was made by a joint sitting of both Houses. This occurred twice:
 Margaret Reid was elected on 5 May 1981 to replace the deceased ACT Senator John Knight
 Bob McMullan was elected on 16 February 1988 to replace former ACT Senator Susan Ryan, who had resigned.

Casual vacancies for ACT senators are now filled by the ACT Legislative Assembly, under Section 44 of the Commonwealth Electoral Act 1918.

A joint sitting of the federal parliament would still be used to fill a casual vacancy in the representation of any external territory, in the event that such a territory ever gains separate Senate representation.

Special commemorative joint sitting
On 9 May 2001, the Parliament met in a special joint sitting at the site of the 1st Parliament, the Royal Exhibition Building in Melbourne, to commemorate the Centenary of that event specifically, and the Centenary of Federation more generally.  The joint sitting was addressed by the Governor-General, Sir William Deane.

Secret meetings
During World War II, the Parliament met in secret on a number of occasions, to hear confidential reports on the progress of the war. There is no Hansard record of the proceedings.

Both Houses met in secret joint sittings on 20 February 1942, 3 September 1942, and 8 October 1942.

The House of Representatives met in secret on 13 December 1940, 29 May 1941, and 20 August 1941.

General Douglas MacArthur is sometimes reported to have addressed the Parliament during World War II. If he addressed the secret joint sittings, this was not officially recorded. However, General MacArthur was provided with a seat on the floor of the House of Representatives on 26 March 1942, and addressed members of Parliament from outside the chamber later that day.

Addresses by invited guests

The first address by an invited guest to the Parliament in a formally convened joint sitting of which there was an official record was on 2 January 1992, by the US President, George H. W. Bush.  Later addresses to joint sittings were from US presidents Bill Clinton (1996) and George W. Bush (2003); and paramount leader of China Hu Jintao (2003). (George W. Bush's and Hu Jintao's addresses occurred on consecutive days in October 2003.)

Subsequently, the Senate Standing Committee on Procedure and the Senate Standing Committee of Privileges both recommended that the practice of formally convening a joint sitting for these purposes be discontinued, as they had no constitutional authority, and there were doubts about the validity of the presiding officer of one house giving instructions to members of the other house.  On 2 March 2006, it was agreed that future addresses by invited dignitaries would be to a meeting of the House of Representatives only, but to which the members of the Senate would be invited as guests.

List of addresses 

 Source: Australia's Parliament House—more than 25 years in the making! A chronology

References

Parliament of Australia
Australia